Big Breadwinner Hog is a British television thriller serial devised by Robin Chapman, produced by Granada TV and transmitted in eight parts, starting at 9.00pm on 11 April 1969 on the ITV network.

Overview
The series focussed on the ruthless rise through the criminal underworld of the trendy young London gangster Hogarth (Peter Egan). He exploits the resources of a declining gangster, Ryan (Godfrey Quigley), to take over the dominant crime syndicate Scot-Yanks, controlled by the equally ruthless and manipulative Lennox (Timothy West). The key to Hogarth's success is knowledge of a murder arranged by Lennox, of which there is a crucial witness, Ackerman (Donald Burton), a one-time private eye who has been blackmailed into working for Scot-Yanks and bitterly resents Lennox.

The eight-part serial was widely condemned at the time for its amorality and violence. Its first episode featured a scene in which a jar of hydrochloric acid was thrown into a rival's face. "Barely minutes after the first episode was transmitted, the Granada TV switchboard was inundated" with viewers' complaints about the violence and the second episode was preceded by a Granada apology for the previous week's episode. Granada toned down some of the more violent aspects of later episodes but despite this, viewer complaints continued and from episode 5 some ITV regions moved transmission to a later timeslot. Southern Television and Anglia Television stopped transmission of the serial.

The serial was directed by Mike Newell (later of Four Weddings and a Funeral) and Michael Apted. It gave an early role to John Challis, later Boycie of Only Fools and Horses and an important role for Priscilla Morgan. Peter Egan is also better known these days for sitcoms like Ever Decreasing Circles (1984–89), Joint Account (1989) and Home Again (2006)

Cast
 Hogarth           –          Peter Egan
 Edge              –          Rosemary McHale
 Ryan              –          Godfrey Quigley
 Spicer            –          Barry Linehan
 Singleton         –          Tony Steedman
 Lennox            –          Timothy West
 Gould             –          Hamilton Dyce
 Moira             –          Priscilla Morgan
 Ackerman          –          Donald Burton
 Greenwood         –          Brian McDermott
 Izzard            –          Alan Browning
 Grange            –          David Leland
 Raymond           –          James Hunter
 Nicholson         –          Tenniel Evans
 Walker            –          Arthur Pentelow
 Parker            –          John Horsley
 Raspberry         –          Peter Thomas
 Operative         –          John Challis

DVD release
The series was released on Region 2 DVD in a box set with Spindoe by Network DVD in June 2007.  The series is presented on the DVD from the original videotapes, except episode one (containing the infamous acid-throwing scene) which exists only via a telerecorded film copy, where the image quality is noticeably inferior to the other episodes.

Disc 3 (the 3rd "Hog" disk) contains an episode of the 1972 LWT series, Villains, a serial as seen from the bank robbers point of view.  The included episode focuses on womanising safe-cracker Charles Grindley as played by Bob Hoskins.

References

External links
 

1960s British drama television series
1969 British television series debuts
ITV television dramas
1969 British television series endings
Television series by ITV Studios
Television shows produced by Granada Television
English-language television shows